is a Japanese anime series by Nippon Animation. It is about an 11-year-old girl and her best friend Tico, a female orca.

Unlike the other series in Nippon Animation's World Masterpiece Theater line, Tico of the Seven Seas is an entirely original story. A novelization of the series written by Akira Hiroo was eventually published in 3 volumes by Kadokawa Sneaker Bunko in conjunction with the broadcasting.

An English dub of the series, entitled Tico & Friends, was produced by Ocean Studios. The dubbed series omits major character deaths and also edits out some violent, bloody and death scenes; one episode from the original version, which focuses on the aftermath of a major character death, is even omitted completely and replaced with a makeshift clip show episode (although some scenes from the omitted episode are included in the replacement).

Plot
Nanami Simpson is a young Japanese-American girl. Having lost her mother when she was young, she now lives with her marine biologist father, Scott Simpson, on board his research vessel, the Peperonchino. Scott has been in search of a creature known as the Luminous Whale, a whale that can glow brightly underwater, for many years and is determined to eventually see it and preserve its existence. Nanami also is close friends with an orca named Tico, who was rescued as a baby just before Nanami was born. The two have an unbreakable bond and swim with each other every day. As a result, Nanami gradually learns to hold her breath longer and swim deeper than other humans can.

Scott's search from the Luminous Whale soon puts him at odds with the Gaiatron Corporation, a greedy research conglomerate led by the ruthless and ambitious Adrienne Benex, who wishes to exploit the creature for a rare element it seemingly carries in its body. Aiding Benex are her right-hand man, Gaulois, and Dr. Charles LeConte, an old acquaintance of Scott's who is obsessed with the Luminous Whale.

Together, Nanami, Scott, and Tico, along with Scott's first-mate and right-hand man, Al Andretti, seek to locate the Luminous Whale before Benex and Gaiatron can. Over time, they are joined by a few new crew members:
 Cheryl Melville, an English-American heiress looking for adventure.
 James McIntyre, Cheryl's loyal butler.
 Thomas LeConte, Dr. LeConte's introverted and lonely, but intelligent son, who wishes to prove himself capable in the real world.
 Junior, Tico's calf, born nearly halfway through the series.

As their journey goes on, the crew of Peperonchino encounter and make both new friends and enemies, and form bonds with each other, as they race against the corrupt Benex and Gaiatron to find the Luminous Whale first.

Characters

Main
 Nanami Simpson
 Voiced by Megumi Hayashibara; Chantal Strand in the English dub
 Nanami is the main protagonist in the series. At 11-years old, she claims all creatures from the sea are her friends. She has been friends with Tico ever since she was a baby, and has a close relationship with her father Scott, and friendships with all of their crew members throughout the series.

 Tico
 A killer whale who is a life-long friend to Nanami. In the Japanese version, she dies freeing Al's submersible from an iceberg crevice, which mortally injures her, and her body sinks to the depths of the sea, while Nanami looks on helplessly. In the last episode, "The Shining Circle" her spirit reunites with Nanami and her son via the Luminous Whale. In the English dub, she is still injured, but survives and the crew is forced to leave her behind to let her recover. She returns a few episodes later, shortly after her son Junior leaves the crew to join a super-pod of killer whales. In the final episode, the spirit that Tico reunites with turns out to be her own long-lost mother.

 Junior
 Junior is Tico's calf. In the Japanese original series, he takes Tico's place as Nanami's companion, along with her name, after the former sacrifices herself to save Al. He meets his mother again the series finale, "The Shining Circle". In the English dub, his mother survives, and is left behind to recover, returning not long after he leaves to join a super-pod of killer whales.

 Scott Simpson
 Voiced by Shuuichi Ikeda; David Kaye in the English dub
 Nanami's father, who is a marine biologist, and captain of the Peperoncino. He has been searching for the Luminous Whale for seven years. He is a dedicated father to his daughter and is often the level-headed one for his crew. Scott is also very protective of his research of the Luminous Whale, refusing to let it or the creature itself fall into the wrong hands.

 Alfonso "Al" Andretti
 A fat Italian man who works with Scott, and always on the lookout for treasure. He is the chef and engineer of Peperoncino and often comes up with get-rich quick schemes in order to make the crew money. He serves as something of an uncle and mentor to Nanami and later to Thomas as well. A scene where he punches Professor LeConte in the stomach is removed.

 Cheryl Christina Melville
 Voiced by Venus Terzo in the English dub.
 An English-American woman who comes from a wealthy family and craves adventure. She initially has a frosty relationship with the crew, particularly Nanami and Al (due to her joining the crew on a whim, and her initial reluctance to do any actual work), but they all soon warm up to her, and she ends up becoming a valued member and even something of a big sister to Nanami and Thomas. Due to her wealth, she often serves as the source for emergency funds when the crew needs them. Initially, she relies on her butler James to do the crew work for her, but later starts contributing by herself following his brief departure from the crew in the seventh episode, and becomes more independent as a result.

 James McIntyre
 Voiced by David Kaye in the English dub
 Cheryl's loyal butler. Born near the Cliffs of Dover, he has served the Melville family faithfully for many years, and is charged with looking after Cheryl while she attends college in New York. James joins the crew of the Peperoncino at the same time as Cheryl, but leaves in the seventh episode and joins the crew of the Gaiatron ship Scorpio, after switching places with Thomas LeConte. He returns to the Peperoncino ten episodes later, and remains with the crew up to the series finale.

 Thomas LeConte
 A boy the Peperoncino crew met in the Bahamas and the son of scientist Dr. Charles LeConte. Intelligent and computer-savvy, but also introverted, lonely, and somewhat cautious, he craves attention from his father, but is often pushed aside and neglected due to Dr. LeConte's research regarding the Luminous Whale. In his first appearance in the second episode, he cons Nanami and Al in helping him return to his ship in return for a treasure map that turns out to be fake. Several episodes later, the crew meets him again on his father's ship, and after being rescued after getting trapped underwater in the Peperoncinos mini-sub, he decides to join their crew to go out into the world and become more extroverted, becoming Al's unofficial apprentice and Nanami's closest human friend. By the end of the series, he manages to patch things up with his father.

Other characters

 Nagisa Suzuki
 Nanami's aunt from her mother, Yuko's side of the family.

 Gayle
 A con-man with a heart of gold, and a crush on Cheryl. He also has a fear of fish.

 Richard
 A free-lance photographer who informs the Peperoncino crew about Metal Claw's activities.

 Lolo
 Richard's pet parrot.

 Metal Claw
 Voiced by Daisuke Gouri; Scott McNeil in the English dub
 A villain from the earlier part in the series, he is a man who has a metal hand in place of his right hand. Captain of the Mentil.

 Professor Charles LeConte
 A scientist who is an old acquaintance of Scott Simpson, and Thomas's father. Obsessed with the Luminous Whale, LeConte's determination to find it causes him to ally himself with the corrupt Gaiatron Corporation, and neglect his son. By the end of the series, however, he learns the error of his ways and reconciles with Thomas. A scene where he slaps his son is edited out in the English Dub.

 Stephen
 A member of the crew on the Scorpio.

 Topia
 Voiced by Akiko Yajima

 Enrico Andretti
 Voiced by Bin Shimada
 A cousin of Al's, who lives with their grandmother.

 Don Gould (Mr. Krang in the English dub)
 Head of the Rio Connection.

 Rozalint Andretti
 Voiced by Hisako Kyōda; Kathleen Barr in the English dub
 Al's 94-year-old grandmother who lives in Italy.

 Adrienne Benex
 Voiced by Chiyoko Kawashima
 The main villain of the series. Professor LeConte's superior, she owns the Gaiatron Corporation. She wants the luminous whale due to an element it is said to have, called trontium. In the Japanese series, she is killed when seagulls attack and incapacitate the pilots of her escape helicopter, causing it to crash into her Antarctic Base, The Iron City, with her in it. The seagulls were summoned, along with other animals, by the luminous whale to attack the base. This is edited out in the English dub.

 Gaulois
 Voiced by Keisuke Yamashita
 Benex's underling.

 Terry Taft
 Voiced by Yumi Tōma
 A boy Nanami meets who uses a wheelchair. He lost the use of his legs at the same time he lost his sister, Maggie.

 Opiac
 A young girl of the north Arctic whose grandfather is a descendant of one of has seen the luminous whale.

 Luminous whale
 A whale whose body glows yellow. It is semi-supernatural, as it summoned animals to attack the iron city base, showed Nanami her future, and brought the Ghost of Tico for a final Goodbye to her friend and Son. It can still die though, as evidence by its fossils being found by Scott Simpson, and it almost drying up when hoisted out of the Ocean by Adrienne Bennex's men.

Staff
 Produced by Koichi Motohashi
 Production Management: Juichi Motohashi
 Planning: Kenji Shimizu, Shoji Sato
 Character Design: Satoko Morikawa
 Art Setting by Kazue Itô
 Art Director: Shigeru Morimoto
 Director of Photography: Toshiaki Morita
 Music by Michiru Ōshima
 Sound Director: Sadayoshi Fujino
 Producers: Yoshihiro Suzuki, Akio Yogo
 Directed by Jun Takagi
 Produced by Fuji TV, Nippon Animation

English dub
 Voices: Lisa Ann Beley, Don Brown, Michael Dobson, Paul Dobson, Andrew Francis, David Kaye, Scott McNeil, John Payne, Chantal Strand, Venus Terzo, Richard Newman

Episodes
 Nanami, A Little Adventurer (The Girl With the Killer Whale! Adventurer Nanami)
 Thomas And The Treasure Map (The Caribbean Pirates are After Children!?)
 Trouble In The Atlantic (The Arrival of the Atlantic Ocean Gang!?)
 Flight On The High Seas (Run, Run, and Run Some More!!)
 Saving The Seals (Rio de Janeiro Never Sleeps)
 The Blue Whale (The Day We Met the Blue Whale)
 Crisis Beneath The Sea! (At the Bottom of the Atlantic! Thomas Alone!)
 Al's Treasure Hunt (The Sunken Ship of the Zaire River The Mystery of Treasure)
 The Secret Of The Cave (The ship that floats in the phantom underground lake)
 Overland To The Nile (Tico takes the road)
 Princess Nanami (Nanami, Princess of the Ocean)
 Friends Of The Family
 Beware Of The Giant Toys
 Al Comes Home
 Nanami Saves the Island
 Tico's Baby
 Junior's First Breath
 Cheryl Gets Engaged
 Panic In The Oilfield
 Growing Pains
 The Legend Of The Northern Lights
 The Mystery Of The Iceberg
 The Heart Of The Ice Mountain
 A Trip To Japan
 Nanami Remembers
 A Letter To Grandma (clip show)
 The Ghost Ship
 The Deep-Sea Sub
 Island Of The Butterflies
 The Miracle Egg
 Cheryl And Scott Get Stranded
 New Leads On The Luminous Whale
 Another Luminous Creature
 A Close Encounter
 Discovery!
 Operation: Capture!
 The Antarctic Foundation
 Nature To The Rescue
 The Shining Circle

MusicOpening ThemeSea Loves You
Lyrics by: Chiho Seiko
Composition by: Osamu Tozuka
Arrangement by: Arisu Sato
Song by: Mayumi ShinozukaEnding Theme'''
Twinkle Talk
Lyrics by: Chiho Seiko
Composition by: Osamu Tozuka
Arrangement by: Arisu Sato
Song by: Mayumi Shinozuka

CG Film
A CG-animated film titled Nanami and the Quest for Atlantis'' based on the series is currently in production. Unlike the series; the film will take place in 1850 during the Gold Rush era.

International titles
Asrar Al Moheet (Arabic)
Ein Toller Freund (German)
Nanatsu no Umi no Tico (Japanese)
Tico ein toller Freund (German)
Tico et ses amis (French)
Tico of the Seven Seas
Tico y sus Amigos (Spanish)
Un oceano di avventure (Italian)
أسرار المحيط (Arabic)
七つの海のティコ (Japanese)
七海小英雄 (Chinese (Taiwan))
Тико и её друзья (Russian)
Tico a přátelé (Czech)
Тіко та друзі (Ukrainian)

References

External links 

1994 anime television series debuts
Adventure anime and manga
Animated television series about mammals
Fictional orcas
World Masterpiece Theater series